Remo language may refer to:

 Several languages of Peru, also known as Sakuya, Sacuya, Kukuini, or Cucuini, an extinct Panoan language of South America
Môa Remo language
Blanco River Remo language
Jaquirana Remo language
Bonda language or Remo, an Austro-Asiatic language spoken by the Bonda people of India